The Volga Delta is the largest river delta in Europe and occurs where Europe's largest river system, the Volga River drains into the Caspian Sea in Russia's Astrakhan Oblast, north-east of the republic of Kalmykia. The delta is located in the Caspian Depression—the far eastern part of the delta lies in Kazakhstan.

The Volga delta has grown significantly in the 20th century because of changes in the level of the Caspian Sea. It has a classical "delta pattern". The delta lies in the arid climate zone, characterized by very little rainfall. The region receives less than one inch of rainfall in January and in July in normal years. Strong winds often sweep across the delta and form linear dunes. Along the front of the delta, one will find muddy sand shoals, mudflats, and coquina banks.

Three Zones 
The changing level of the Caspian Sea has resulted in three distinct zones in the delta.

The higher areas of the first zone are known as "Baer's mounds," named after researcher Karl Ernst von Baer who worked in this region. These depressions, called "" (from Russian through Finnish, "small lake," as in Russia's Lake Ilmen), used to form part of the early, very deep river delta but gradually became separated from it. Because of their isolation from the fresh waters of the Volga, they are becoming increasingly saline. Together they form a "vast (more than ) and extremely diverse area of western substeppe  (WSI)" which, because of the varying degrees of wetness and salinization, house a wealth of flora and fauna.

The second zone, in the delta proper, generally has very little relief (usually less than one metre), and is the site of active and abandoned water channels, small dunes and algal flats.

Wildlife 
The delta has been protected since the early 1900s, with one of the first Russian nature preserves (Astrakhan Nature Reserve) having been set up there in 1919. Much of its local fauna is considered endangered. The delta is a major staging area for many species of water birds, raptors and passerines. Although the delta is best known for its sturgeons, catfish and carp are also found in large numbers in the delta region. The lotus has been adopted as the motif of the national flag of the neighbouring Kalmyks, since it is a venerated symbol in their Buddhist beliefs – they are the sole European people of Mongolian (Oirat) origin.

Protection and Destruction 
Industrial and agricultural modification to the delta plain has resulted in significant wetland loss. The Volga discharges large amounts of industrial waste and sediment into the relatively shallow northern part of the Caspian Sea. The added fertilizers nourish the algal blooms that grow on the surface of the sea, allowing them to grow larger.

References

Wetland Loss in World Deltas, Coastal Studies Institute, Louisiana State University
wetlands.org
Earth Snapshot article "The Three Zones of the Volga Delta"

External links

 Volga River Delta at NASA Earth Observatory
Volga Delta at Natural Heritage Protection Fund

Freshwater ecoregions
River deltas of Europe
Landforms of Russia
Caspian Sea
Biosphere reserves of Russia
Landforms of Astrakhan Oblast
Volga basin
Ramsar sites in Russia